Ntsokoane Samuel Matekane (born 15 March 1958) is a Mosotho businessman and politician who is serving as Prime Minister of Lesotho as of 28 October 2022. Prior to running he was considered to be the richest person in the country. Matekane has made his fortune in business, mainly in diamond mining. He founded his company, Matekane Group of Companies (MGC) in 1986.

In March 2022,  Matekane held a press conference at his boutique hotel, and declared he would pivot from business to politics and formed the Revolution for Prosperity (RFP) party. The RFP shocked the political system in the country.  Matekane self-funded a state-of-the-art political campaign with a heavy social media presence and went on to win the 2022 Lesotho General Election, amid a long period of political dissatisfaction from government instability in country. Matekane's win is considered to have been heavily influenced by his social media campaign.  His campaign's financial advantage on the ground, along with his social media reach and presence was unmatched by the other 63 parties that contested the election.

Through MGC, Matekane has funded several social projects in the country. Matekane has funded the construction of a football stadium, a school, and a convention center and a cost-sharing owner-farmer scheme farm in his village of Mantšonyane. During the COVID-19 pandemic, he bought testing equipment, vaccines and other medical necessities and donated them. He has made many generous donations  in the amount of M8 million in forms to the Police, and many millions on an Ambulance, ICU beds, Stretchers, Wheelchairs, Laundry Machine and Dryer and 1000 Military Uniforms  donated to the Lesotho Defense Force.

Early life 
Born on March 15, 1958, Matekane is the seventh of fourteen siblings. He was born in the very remote village of Mantšonyane in what was then called British Basutoland, now Lesotho.

Matekane attended primary school and completed Form C (Year 10). For a short time, he became a heard boy and then moved to Maseru with distant relatives for studies. After completing Form C, he was sent to apprentice as a mechanic in South Africa.  Upon the completion of his apprenticeship, he worked in the South African Mines. His stint in the mines was short and he returned to Maseru in his early 20s, where he began working as a salesman of wool and mohair, along with other goods until forming his company.

Business 
Matekane is the founder and CEO of the Matekane Group of Companies (MGC), which was established in 1986 as a construction equipment  sales business. The business initially purchased old and damaged vehicles from the government, to repair and resell it back to the government.  This was a unique arrangement that allowed Matekane to put his mechanic skills into good use. His company grew steadily, and expanded to the areas of mining, aviation, real estate and philanthropy.

His philanthropic work has led to the donation of uniforms to the police, donation of ambulances, building a state-of-the art school in his home district, and most recently the creation of cost share farm with local villagers.

Politics 
In March 2022, several months before the 2022 Lesotho general election, Matekane founded a party called Revolution for Prosperity (RFP). He positioned himself as the protector of the country's business community, the messianic leader that would bring stability to Lesotho politics, and the sole businessmen in the country that could end corruption and bring Lesotho back from the recession it has been experiencing since 2017.  Matekane has made a  declaration to "Make Lesotho Great Again" by any means necessary.

Politicians and businessmen across the South Africa Region have been impressed by his meteoric rise in politics. Matekane's campaign was a sharp public relations campaign never before seeing in the country.  His campaign victory was paved by outspending his rivals and by making case for why career politicians  were no longer serving Lesotho's best interests. He was considered an outsider while campaigning and that status helped win the popular vote.  Matekane's RFP party finished five seats shy of an absolute majority in the National Assembly. Short of a simple majority to rule alone, Matekane formed a coalition government with two parties with less than 3 seats each in the assembly, the Alliance of Democrats and Movement for Economic Change.

After his electoral win, Matekane has vowed to hit the ground running. He outline a 20-point plan to fight corruption and the M6.1billion Government Deficit, within the first 100 days in office.  He plans to reverse the economic recession via austerity and job creation from international investors, and achieve what can be normally be achieve in 20 years in his first term in office.

References 

|-

1958 births
Living people
Prime Ministers of Lesotho
Revolution for Prosperity politicians
People from Thaba-Tseka District
Lesotho billionaires